AS-15 may refer to:

 one of the two Kashalot-class submarines
 a Kh-55 missile
 the submarine tender USS Bushnell (AS-15)